Earle Spear Warner (August 12, 1880 – December 1971) was an American lawyer and politician from New York.

Life
He was born on August 17, 1880, on a farm in the Town of Phelps, Ontario County, New York, the son of Henry D. Warner (1844–1908) and Frances Belle (Spear) Warner. He graduated B.Litt. from Hobart College in 1902, and LL.B. from Cornell Law School in 1905. He was admitted to the bar the same year, and practiced in Phelps. On November 26, 1907, he married Selma L. Holbrook (born 1885). In 1908, he was appointed as Attorney of the Village of Phelps and held this office until 1945.

Warner was a member of the New York State Senate from 1933 to 1945, sitting in the 156th, 157th, 158th, 159th, 160th, 161st, 162nd, 163rd, 164th and 165th New York State Legislature. He was a delegate to the 1940 Republican National Convention. He resigned his senate seat on January 22, 1945, and was appointed to the New York Supreme Court.

He was a justice of the Supreme Court (7th D.) from 1945 to 1950, and an Official Referee (i.e. a senior judge on an additional seat) of the Supreme Court from 1951 to 1956. In June 1954, he decided to annul a marriage after thirteen years, and give custody of the two daughters to the wife, because the husband had committed a fraud by hiding from his wife his belief in communism.

He died in December 1971.

Sources

1880 births
1971 deaths
Republican Party New York (state) state senators
New York Supreme Court Justices
People from Phelps, New York
Hobart and William Smith Colleges alumni
Cornell Law School alumni
20th-century American judges
20th-century American politicians